Messezentrum Salzburg is an exhibition center in the Austrian state capital of Salzburg, in the district of Liefering. Connected to the Messezentrum Salzburg is the Salzburgarena, a multi-functional event hall which is part of the center.

With about 37 trade fairs and exhibitions, the Messezentrum Salzburg attracts up to 591,599 visitors each year.

History
Today’s Messezentrum Salzburg GmbH was founded as "Salzburger Ausstellungs Zentrum Ges.m.b.H." in 1973 by the City of Salzburg, the Province of Salzburg and the Chamber of Commerce. In 1969 a new, permanent location for the Dult, a public festival of Salzburg, was needed. The municipal council chose a site in the district of Liefering.

In 1974 the first three halls were used for a trade fair (AutoZum). The fourth hall was completed in 1974, with two more halls opened in 1976. Today, there are 15 multi-functional halls.

Data
Total size of exhibition halls: 34,828 m² (without Salzburgarena)
 Exhibition halls: 15 multi-functional halls laid out in a concentric pattern
 Size of exhibition halls: 1,650 m² up to 6,000 m² 
 Number of visitors per year: around 591,599
 Digital information system for visitors, WLAN
 Outdoor area: 22,000 m²
 3,400 parking spaces

Trade fairs
The majority of the trade fairs are organized by Reed Exhibitions, which is an internationally operating corporation group,  some are organized by the Messezentrum Salzburg GmbH (formerly Salzburger Ausstellungs Zentrum Ges.m.b.H.) and by guest organizers. Since the halls of the Messezentrum are connected with the Salzburgarena through an indoor-access, it is possible to combine the two locations for an event.

 Auto Messe Salzburg – International trade fair for cars, motorcycles and tuning 
 Berufs-Info-Messe 
 Classic Expo – International trade fair for classic cars
 Musik Salzburg 
 Monumento – Trade fair for monument preservation
 Quo Vadis 
 Salzburger Dult – Public festival of Salzburg
 Salzburger Spielemesse

Salzburgarena

The Salzburgarena is a multi-functional hall directly connected to the Messezentrum Salzburg. It was opened in 2003 and is used for major events. The oval wooden dome of the Salzburgarena is the largest in Western Austria and there is space for up to 6,700 people.

Access
The Messezentrum Salzburg has its own exit on the motorway A1, or it can be reached via the Münchner Bundesstraße. From the city centre the city bus no 1 stops in front of the Messezentrum (free ride when there is an event). There are 3,400 car parking spaces which are used as Park & Ride car parks during July and August. The Salzburg Airport and the main station are close (ca. 3 km).

References

External links

Buildings and structures in Salzburg
Tourist attractions in Salzburg
Trade fairs in Austria
Fairgrounds